Michele Tedesco (24 August 1834 – 1918) was an Italian painter.

Life
Tedesco was born in Moliterno to James and Anna in 1834. He always showed an interest in art and his mother's brother Antonio Racioppi arranged for him to study painting at the School of Humanities and Fine Arts in Naples.

In 1860 he moved to Florence and from there he toured the major cities of Europe making a living from his talents. Whilst in Bavaria he married a fellow painter and he and Julia Hoffman established a home in Naples. In 1877 he started to teach painting and drawing in Portici and led the department of drawing and sketching. In 1890 he was elected to a chair at the Design Institute of fine Arts in Naples where he enjoyed critical acclaim.

Tedesco died in Naples in 1916. He has a large 1877 canvas showing A Pythagorean School Invaded by Sybarites  in the Guildhall Art Gallery in London.

In 2012 there was a major retrospective of Tedesco's work and his contribution to Italian history.

References

1834 births
1918 deaths
People from the Province of Potenza
19th-century Italian painters
Italian male painters
20th-century Italian painters
19th-century Italian male artists
20th-century Italian male artists